Novokuktovo (Yañı Küktaw) is a rural locality (a village) in Karabashevsky Selsoviet, Ilishevsky District, Bashkortostan, Russia. The population was 316 as of 2010. There are 4 streets.

Geography 
Novokuktovo is located 8 km southwest of Verkhneyarkeyevo (the district's administrative centre) by road. Karabashevo is the nearest rural locality.

References 

Rural localities in Ilishevsky District